Nuummite is a rare metamorphic rock that consists of the amphibole minerals gedrite and anthophyllite. It is named after the area of Nuuk in Greenland, where it was found.

Description
Nuummite is usually black in colour and opaque. It consists of two amphiboles, gedrite and anthophyllite, which form exsolution lamellae that give the rock its typical iridescence. Other common minerals in the rock are pyrite, pyrrhotite and chalcopyrite, which form shimmering yellow bands in polished specimens.

In Greenland the rock was formed by two consecutive metamorphic overprints of an originally igneous rock. The intrusion took place in the Archean around 2800 million years ago and the metamorphic overprint was dated at 2700 and 2500 million years ago.

History
The rock was first discovered in 1810 in Greenland by the mineralogist K. L. Giesecke.
 It was defined scientifically by O. B. Bøggild between 1905 and 1924. True Nuummite is only found in Greenland. 
Due to its iridescent nature, this rare stone is sought after by gemstone dealers, collectors and those interested in the esoteric qualities of minerals and gem stones. It is often sold with tumble finishing or as Cabochons.

In 2009, a new Variety of Nuummite was discovered in central Mauritania. Under its unofficial name Jenakite, this variety is distinctive due to the presence and high density of blue and green Anthophyllite needle-like crystals. It has no golden Anthophyllite needle-like crystals.

Nuummite from Greenland predominantly has golden and occasionally blue Anthophyllite needle-like crystals.

References

Further reading
 P. W. U. Appel & A. Jensen: A new gem material from Greenland: iridescent orthoamphibole [nuummite]. Gems and Gemology, 23, P. 3642, 1987 (Online Extract)
 K. A. Rodgers et al.: Iridescent anthophyllite-gedrite from Simiuttat, Nuuk district, southern West Greenland. Composition, exsolution, age. Mineralogical Magazine, Vol. 60, P. 937–947, December 1996 (Online Extract)

Gemstones
Metamorphic rocks